Opakermoen is a village in the municipality of Nes, Akershus, Norway. Its population (2008) is 448.

The local sports team is Funnefoss/Vormsund IL.

References

Villages in Akershus
Nes, Akershus